Erebuni-Homenmen Football Club, is a defunct Armenian professional football club that was based in the capital Yerevan.

History
The club was founded as Homenmen-FIMA FC in 1992 in the Armenian capital Yerevan, representing the sporting club of the Armenian State Institute of Physical Culture. They participated in the first ever Armenian football competition in 1992 after the split-up from the Soviet Union. After the regular competition they qualified for the championship stage where they finished in the 9th position. As a result, they have qualified for the highest level in the 1993 season.

In 1995, the club became known as Homenmen Yerevan FC, representing the pan-Armenian sports and scouting organization Homenmen (founded in Aleppo in 1921). In 1997, the club was renamed as Erebuni-Homenmen FC. In 1999, the Homenmen organization withdrew its sponsorship from the club. As a result, the team was forced to retire from professional football at the beginning of 2000, due to financial difficulties.

In spite of several sponsoring changes and financial obstacles, the club had never been relegated form the Armenian Premier League.

Erebuni-Homenmen in the European cups

Home results are noted in bold

References

Erebuni
Defunct football clubs in Armenia
Association football clubs established in 1992
1992 establishments in Armenia
Association football clubs disestablished in 2000
2000 disestablishments in Armenia